Archibald McPherson Stark (December 21, 1897 – May 27, 1985) was a U.S. soccer player who became the dominant player in U.S. leagues during the 1920s and early 1930s. He spent nine seasons in the National Association Football League and another twelve in the American Soccer League. He also earned two caps, scoring five goals, as a member of the U.S. national team. He holds the U.S. single-season scoring record with 67 goals (including 8 hat-tricks) scored during the 1924–25 season which is the current World Record. He was inducted into the National Soccer Hall of Fame in 1950.

Youth and early career
Although Stark and his brother Tommy Stark were born in Scotland, they moved to the United States when Archie was thirteen years old. His family settled in Hudson County, New Jersey, where Stark immediately began his organized soccer career with the West Hudson Juniors.  For a player who made his name as a forward, Stark began as a defender with the Juniors. Stark turned professional a year later when he signed with the Scottish-Americans of the National Association Football League for the 1912–1913 season. At the time he was only fourteen. He remained with the Scottish-Americans for four seasons. In 1915, the Scottish-Americans won the 1915 American Cup, defeating Brooklyn Celtic 1–0 on a Stark goal. The next season, the team lost the AFA championship game when Bethlehem Steel crushed them 3–0. At the end of the 1915–1916 season, Stark moved to the Bayonne, New Jersey, club Babcock & Wilcox.
However, World War I intervened and Stark joined the U.S. Army in 1917, briefly interrupting his career. Stark served in France.

Post-war resurgence
When he returned to the U.S. in 1919, he joined Paterson F.C., which went to the 1919 National Challenge Cup final, losing to Bethlehem Steel 2–0. Following the cup, Stark joined Bethlehem for the team's August 10, 1919, to September 24, 1919, tour of Sweden and Denmark. On that tour, Bethlehem went 6–2–6 (W-L-T). Stark then moved to Kearny, New Jersey, club Erie A.A. of the NAFBL. In a controversial decision, league officials awarded Erie A.A. the title even though Bethlehem Steel had one more point. Bethlehem Steel appealed to the U.S. Soccer Football Association, which reversed the decision. Stark remained with Erie A.A., now known as Harrison Erie S.C., through the end of the 1920–1921 season, but when several teams defected to form a new league, to be known as the American Soccer League (ASL), the NAFBL folded. Stark then jumped to the New York Field Club of the ASL in 1921. By this time he had gained a reputation as a prolific scorer and was sought after by several teams. In three seasons with New York F.C., Stark scored forty-five goals in sixty-nine games. In his last season with the team, he bagged nearly a goal a game when he scored twenty-one in twenty-five games.

Bethlehem Steel
In the off-season after the 1923–24 season, the New York F.C. franchise was sold to the Indiana Flooring Company and Stark was among the players who went with the franchise. Indiana Flooring waived Stark and Bethlehem Steel F.C. picked him up just before the new season. Stark's move to Bethlehem would gain him his greatest recognition, as Bethlehem moved him to center forward from the right wing position he had played with New York. Bethlehem had some of the deepest pockets in the ASL and used that money to sign several top Scottish internationals. Surrounded by talent, Stark responded by scoring 67 goals in 44 games in his first season with the team, including eight hat-tricks, which is the correct World Record for an individual. He also scored three more goals in two league cup games. The next season, Stark earned his first title with Bethlehem as the team took the 1926 National Challenge Cup. Bethlehem rolled over Ben Millers by a score of 7–2, Stark scoring three of the goals. Bethlehem went on to take the 1926–1927 ASL title, then the 1928–1929 and fall 1929 Eastern Soccer League titles.

In what became known as the Soccer War, FIFA declared the ASL an “outlaw league” in 1927. Reasons for this centered on a dispute between the ASL and the U.S. Football Association (USFA), which was backed by FIFA, about control of the sport in the United States. FIFA and USFA demanded that all ASL teams enter the National Challenge Cup (now the US Open Cup). The ASL refused to force its teams to do so, and FIFA labeled the ASL an “outlaw league”. The ASL, with U.S. federal law on its side, announced it would no longer abide by FIFA rules and would boycott FIFA events, including the National Challenge Cup. The ASL, as one of the most competitive and highest paying leagues in the world at the time, expected that many prominent international players would continue to flock to the ASL in defiance of FIFA. In order to reduce the prominence of the ASL, USFA organized a rival league, the Eastern Soccer League, in October 1928. Bethlehem Steel, in defiance of the ASL, had elected to enter the National Challenge Cup and was suspended by the league seven games into the 1928–1929 season, leading Bethlehem to join the ESL. Stark, and Bethlehem Steel, would remain in the ESL for two seasons before returning to the ASL for the team's final season. However, neither Bethlehem Steel nor the ASL could withstand the financial strains imposed by this situation and the Soccer War led to the demise of the ASL and Bethlehem Steel. When Bethlehem Steel folded in 1930, Stark joined the Fall River Marksmen of a tour of Europe. However, the team faced financial difficulties and left the players stranded in Budapest, after which they returned to the U.S. as third class passengers.

End of career: Newark Americans and Kearny Irish
When Bethlehem Steel folded in 1930, Stark moved to the Newark Americans for the 1930–1931 ASL season. He remained with the Americans through the demise of the ASL in 1933. However, the statistics for the last two ASL seasons have been lost and we no longer know how many goals Stark scored during them.

After the first ASL finally collapsed in 1933, Stark ended up with Kearny Irish, which joined the new American Soccer League (ASL II) for the league's inaugural 1933–1934 season. The Irish took the league title, and Stark shared the scoring title with Razzo Carroll of the Kearny Scots.

National team
Stark earned only two caps with the U.S. national team, both in games against Canada in 1925. His first cap came in a 1–0 loss to Canada in Quebec in June. In November, Canada came to the U.S. for a game; Stark scored five goals as the U.S. easily dispatched its northern neighbors 6–1.

While Stark received an invitation to play on the national team at the 1930 FIFA World Cup, he declined the invitation for business reasons.

In 1950, Stark was inducted into the National Soccer Hall of Fame.

Career statistics

Honors
 World Record holder of the Highest Season Scoring Record (67 goals, 1924/25 season)
 Seasonwise World Top Scorer: 1924-25
 U.S. single-season scoring record: 67 goals, 1924/25 season

See also
List of United States men's international soccer players born outside the United States

References

External links
 Biography at Bethlehem Steel Soccer Club
 
 Hall of Fame biography
 American Soccer League statistics
 Cirino, Antonio (Tony): US Soccer Vs The World: The American National Team in the Olympic Games, the World Cup, and Other International Competition, 1983 – 

1897 births
1985 deaths
American soccer players
American Soccer League (1921–1933) players
American Soccer League (1933–1983) players
Babcock & Wilcox F.C. players
Bethlehem Steel F.C. (1907–1930) players
Eastern Professional Soccer League (1928–29) players
Erie A.A. players
Fall River Marksmen players
Kearny Irish players
Kearny Scots (NAFBL) players
National Association Football League players
National Soccer Hall of Fame members
New York Field Club players
Newark Americans players
Paterson F.C. players
Scottish emigrants to the United States
United States men's international soccer players
West Hudson A.A. players
Association football forwards
Footballers from Glasgow
United States Army personnel of World War I